Edward Ka-yin Chow (born September 3, 1987, in Hong Kong) is a Hong Kong figure skater. He is the 2003, 2005, and 2006 Hong Kong national champion.

See also
2007 World Figure Skating Championships
Sports of Hong Kong

References

External links
 

1987 births
Living people
Hong Kong male single skaters
21st-century Hong Kong people